Atlas Venture is an early-stage venture capital firm that invests in life sciences startup companies in the U.S. Atlas is headquartered in Cambridge, Massachusetts, where the majority of its investments are located. Atlas rolled out its eleventh biotech fund totaling $350 million in June 2017, after closing its tenth fund in April 2015, with $280 million in commitments.

History
Atlas has invested in over 150 life sciences startups since it began investing in the sector in 1990. Atlas invests in a range of therapeutic areas, including immuno-oncology, autoimmunity/inflammation, neuroscience, gene/cell therapy and editing, and anti-infectives. The current portfolio includes gene/cell editing/therapy companies AVROBIO, Generation Bio, Intellia Therapeutics, Obsidian Therapeutics, and Unum Therapeutics; oncology companies Bicycle Therapeutics, Kyn Therapeutics, Replimune, Surface Oncology and Unum Therapeutics; autoimmunity companies Nimbus Therapeutics and Padlock Therapeutics; anti-infectives company Spero Therapeutics; synthetic biology company Synlogic; RNA companies miRagen Therapeutics and Translate Bio; and CNS companies Cadent Therapeutics, Disarm Therapeutics, Navitor, and Rodin Therapeutics; and novel platform companies Accent Therapeutics, Kymera Therapeutics, Gemini Therapeutics, HotSpot Therapeutics, and Akero. Notable prior exits from Atlas’ life sciences portfolio include Actelion, Adnexus Therapeutics, Alnylam Pharmaceuticals, Annovation Biopharma, ArQule, Arrow Therapeutics, Arteaus Therapeutics, Avila Therapeutics, CoStim Pharmaceuticals, Crucell, deCODE genetics, Delinia, Exelixis, IFM Therapeutics Inc., Micromet, Momenta Pharmaceuticals, MorphoSys, Nimbus Apollo, Novexel, Padlock Therapeutics, Stromedix, and U3 Pharma.

Originally formed in 1980 in Amsterdam as a subsidiary of NMB Bank, now part of ING Group, Atlas historically invested in both life sciences and information technology startup companies. In October 2014, Atlas announced its shift to a biotech-only venture capital firm, with the technology-focused investment team forming a new firm, Accomplice, to continue investing in information technology startups. Previously as a diversified firm, Atlas had raised over $3.0 billion of investor commitments across nine venture capital funds.  The firm raised $705 million for its 2000-vintage fifth fund, $600 million for its 2001-vintage sixth fund, $385 million for its 2006-vintage seventh fund, $283 million for its 2009-vintage eighth fund, and $265 million for its 2013-vintage ninth fund. At its largest, the firm held European offices in London, Paris and Munich, and a West Coast office based in Seattle, Washington, in addition to the Boston-area headquarters. Today, the firm operates from a single office in Cambridge, Massachusetts.

In 2017, Atlas Venture announced it had raised $350 million in capital to invest in early stage biotech companies in the U.S. and around the world.

In January 2019, the company announced a fundraising with total value of $250 million. In June 2020, Atlas Venture closed its 12th fund at $400 million.

References

Dutch companies established in 1980
Private equity firms of the United States
Venture capital firms of the United States
Companies based in Cambridge, Massachusetts
Financial services companies established in 1980